Aïn-Sbir is a location in Algeria. Aïn Sbir is the location of a spring in Algeria and is nearby to mount Djebel Sekoum, Koudiat Kaïda and mount Oulad Selem. Aïn Sbir is also close to Marabout Sidi Rakhal shirne, Chaba Tebb el Mra and Chaba Khouari. The nearest town is Ali Mendjeli.

Geography
Aïn-Sbir  is located at 36.22833°N 6.53083°E in the province of Constantine, in the northern part of Algeria, 300 km east of the capital, Algiers .  Aïn Sbir is located 727 meters above sea level.

The terrain around the Aïn Sbir is hilly to the southwest, but the northeast is flat.  The terrain around the Aïn Sbir slopes north.  The highest point in the vicinity is 825 meters above sea level, 1.0 km north of Ain Sbir.

Population
Around Aïn Sbir it is quite densely populated, with 239 inhabitants per square kilometer. The nearest city is Constantine, 16.9 km north of Ain Sbir.  The neighborhood around Aïn Sbir consists mainly of farmland.   In the neighborhood around the Aïn Sbir are a number sources of water.

References

Roman sites in Algeria
Catholic titular sees in Africa
Roman towns and cities in Algeria
Numidia (Roman provinces)